Georg Jarzembowski (born 3 February 1947, Braunschweig) is a German politician who served as a Member of the European Parliament for Hamburg from 1991 until 2009. He is a member of the conservative Christian Democratic Union, part of the European People's Party.

References

1947 births
Living people
MEPs for Germany 2004–2009
Christian Democratic Union of Germany MEPs
MEPs for Germany 1999–2004